Bill Todd (July 4, 1930 – August 11, 2021) was a Canadian football player who played for the Winnipeg Blue Bombers and Saskatchewan Roughriders. He previously played junior football for St. Vital in Manitoba.

References

1930 births
2021 deaths
Winnipeg Blue Bombers players
Canadian football people from Winnipeg